Diya Jalay is a Pakistani television series directed by Babar Javed who co-produced it also with Asif Raza Mir under banner A & B Entertainment. It stras Savera Nadeem, Mir, Adnan Siddiqui and Faysal Quraishi in leading roles. It aired on ARY Digital from 4 January 2010 to 17 May 2010, with a total of 20 episodes.

At 10th Lux Style Awards, the series received Best Television Actress - Satellite nomination due to Nadeem's performance.

Plot 

After a rift with her childhood fiance Sameer, Nadia refuses to marry him. She is criticized for this decision and forced to marry a middle aged widower Faizan Ali Shah due to her increasing age. He treats her not more than a known person and insults her dur to her middle-class background but she tries to fulfill her duties and manages to get along with his children.

After years, when children grown up Faizan decides her daughter Hania's marriage with Asfand but things get complicated when Asfand mistakes Nadia as Hania and falls for her. Faizan blames her to mess up his daughter's life to which she decides to leave him.

Cast 

 Savera Nadeem as Nadia
 Asif Raza Mir as Faizan Ali Shah
 Adnan Siddiqui as Asfand
 Faysal Quraishi as Sameer
 Neelam Muneer as Hania
 Babar Khan Hamza
 Maria Wasti as Seemab
 Ismat Zaidi as Nadia's mother
 Natash D'Souza

Reception 
A review from Dawn praised several performances including that of Nadeem, Mir, Siddiqui and Wasti but criticised some loop holes in the story and the slowly moving plot.

Accolades

References 

2010 Pakistani television series debuts
2010 Pakistani television series endings